Allyn is both a unisex given name and a surname. Notable people with the name include:

Given name
 Leigh-Allyn Baker (born 1972), American actress, director and voice artist
 Allyn L. Brown (1883–1973), American judge
 Allyn Capron (1846–1898), US Army captain
 Allyn K. Capron (1871–1898), first US Army officer to die in the Spanish–American War
 Allyn Condon (born 1974), English sprinter
 Allyn Cox (1896–1982), American painter
 Allyn Ferguson (1924–2010), American composer
 Allyn Joslyn (1901–1981), American stage, film and television actor
 Ruth Allyn Marcus (born 1958), American journalist and political commentator
 Allyn McKeen (1905–1978), American college football coach
 Allyn Ann McLerie (born 1926), American dancer
 Francis Allyn Olmsted (1819–1844), American author
 Wayne Allyn Root (born 1961), American businessperson
 Allyn Rose (born 1988), American beauty pageant titleholder and model
 J. Allyn Rosser (born 1957), American poet
 Allyn Stout (1904–1974), American Major League baseball pitcher
 Allyn Taylor (born 1965), American law school professor
 Allyn Vine (1914–1994), American physicist and oceanographer
 Allyn Abbott Young (1876–1929), American economist

Surname
 Arthur Allyn Jr. (1913–1985), American co-owner of the Chicago White Sox baseball team
 Daniel B. Allyn (born 1959), US Army general
 David Allyn (born 1969), American essayist
 Edna Allyn (1861-1927), American librarian
 Eunice Eloisae Gibbs Allyn (1847-1916), American writer
 Jerri Allyn (born 1954), American artist
 John Allyn (1917–1979), American co-owner of the Chicago White Sox baseball team
 Joseph P. Allyn (1833–1869), American judge and journalist
 Louis B. Allyn (1874–1940), American chemistry professor

Geographic names
 Allyn, Washington, unincorporated community in Washington, United States
 Allyn-Grapeview, census-designated place (CDP) in Mason County, Washington, United States
 Allyn Range, a mountain range in New South Wales, Australia
 Mount Allyn, a mountain with an elevation of 1,125 metres (3,691 ft) AHD that is part of the Allyn Range.
 Allyn River, a stream on Allyn Range in the Hunter region of New South Wales, Australia.

See also
 Allan (disambiguation)
 Allen (disambiguation)
 Alleyn

English unisex given names